Asa Howe Cory (May 31, 1814 – June 6, 1892) was a captain of Company H in the 58th Pennsylvania Volunteer Infantry Regiment in the Union Army during the American Civil War.

Early life
Asa Howe Cory was born in Sullivan, Tioga County, Pennsylvania.  He attended the public schools.

Began his career in Wellsboro, Tioga County, Pennsylvania, where he published "The Phoenix" for a period of two years.  He went to Smethport, Pennsylvania, and purchased "The McKean County Journal" and in 1837 changed its name to "The Beacon".  He published that for three years before selling it to J.B. Oviatt.

Was elected as Road Commissioner in Smethport, Pennsylvania, in 1848.

Civil war
In 1861 he raised company H for the 58th Pennsylvania Volunteer Infantry Regiment and became its captain.  Served with the Union Army from October 1, 1861, until he was forced by severe frostbite to resign on August 21, 1862.

Post bellum
Was chosen as Postmaster of Coryville, Pennsylvania.

See also

References
Smethport "Democrat" newspaper dated June 17, 1892.
History of Counties McKean, Elk, Cameron and Potter (Michael A. Leeson, J.H. Beers & Company, Chicago, 1890)

Union Army officers
1814 births
1892 deaths